Bellis rotundifolia is a species of flowering plant in the family Asteraceae. It is native to Algeria and Morocco. The epithet rotundifolia is from New Latin rotundus ("round") plus folium ("leaf").

References

External links
 
 

rotundifolia
Plants described in 1852
Taxa named by Pierre Edmond Boissier
Taxa named by George François Reuter
Flora of Algeria
Flora of Morocco